The Exchange Square Historic District is located in Brodhead, Wisconsin. It was listed on the National Register of Historic Places in 1984 and on the State Register of Historic Places in 1989.

References

Historic districts on the National Register of Historic Places in Wisconsin
National Register of Historic Places in Green County, Wisconsin